The common pike conger or pike eel  (Muraenesox bagio) is a species of eel found throughout most of the Indo-Pacific. In Australia, it is known in the southwest, in Western Australia, around the tropical north of the country, and south to the coast of New South Wales. A strong and muscular fish, the common pike conger is a delicacy in South East Asia and features in various dishes.

Breeding
In Australia, the females lay the eggs off the coasts; the eggs take 9–10 weeks to hatch. A female can lay up to four million eggs in a single year.

References

External links
Pike eel

Fish of Asia
Fish described in 1822
Muraenesocidae